Nivairoalhi is a 2019 Maldivian film written and directed by Moomin Fuad. Produced by Niuma Mohamed under NiuXo Films, the film stars Yoosuf Shafeeu, Aminath Rishfa, Zeenath Abbas, Ahmed Saeed, Nashidha Mohamed, and Ahmed Azmeel. The film was released on 3 January 2019.

Premise
Mana (Niuma Mohamed) and Riffath (Yoosuf Shafeeu) are a modern dual-career couple, much to the disappointment of their parents, who look forward to a grandchild. Mana returns for a study break from abroad and Riffath observes a distinctive change in her behavior. The relationship between the couple is affected by Mana's mood swings.

Cast
 Niuma Mohamed as Mana Rasheed
 Yoosuf Shafeeu as Riffath Abdul Rahman
 Ahmed Asim as Moosa "Hardy" Haidhar
 Aminath Rishfa as Dr. Shehenaz
 Ahmed Azmeel as Hassan
 Mariyam Shakeela as Arifa, Mana's mother
 Aminath Rasheedha as Waheedha, Riffath's mother
 Ismail Zahir as Abdul Rahman, Riffath's father
 Zeenath Abbas as Nafeesa
 Nashidha Mohamed as Ainth
 Ahmed Saeed as Anwar
 Ahmed Ziya as Doctor
 Mariyam Haleem as Hardy's mother
 Ajnaz Ali
 Ahmed Asif
 Mariyam Zoya Hassan as Nuha (Special appearance)
 Mariyam Shifa (Special appearance)
 Aminath Eshal Rasheed

Development
The film was announced on 20 October 2017 at a grand event held to celebrate Niuma Mohamed's twenty-year career. Releasing the first look of the film, Mohamed declared her "onscreen retirement" and indicated the film to be her last, though she would "still continue to serve in the industry behind the camera". A thirty-second teaser was released on 22 November 2017, featuring a demoralized Mohamed shattering a drinking glass by continuously hitting it on his forehead. Mohamed had earlier worked with director Moomin Fuad in the segment "Baiveriyaa" from the unreleased anthology film Hatharu Halha, which was the first Maldivian anthology film project.

It was earlier projected that filming would begin on 25 January 2018, but it was delayed, citing the need for Mohamed to "gain weight to showcase the perfect physique of the character". Filming commenced on 17 June 2018 on R. Inguraidhoo, for a ten-day schedule. All indoor shots were completed during this schedule and filming for outdoor shots began on 11 July 2018 in Male'. An ensemble cast including Yoosuf Shafeeu, Aminath Rishfa, Zeenath Abbas, Ahmed Saeed, Nashidha Mohamed, Ahmed Azmeel, Mariyam Shakeela, Aminath Rasheedha, and Mariyam Haleem were announced in a promotional event held on 10 April 2018.

Soundtrack
The first song from the film, "Reydhanve Mendhanve Dhandhen", sung by Mira Mohamed Majid and Falih Adam, was released on 21 September 2018. Two promotional songs were released prior to the film's release: Zoya's "Maa Rangalhu Vaaney" and Mira Mohamed Majid's "Sihuru Fadhavi Kamana". The latter, directed and edited by Aishath Rishmy and Ravee Farooq, was shot over eight days and was an instant hit upon release.

Release
The film was initially planned to be released on Mohamed's birthday, 20 October 2018. However, the team later accelerated the release date to 19 October 2018 based on fan requests, before pushing it back for an early-2019 release. On 27 September 2018, Mohamed confirmed that dubbing for the film was halted since she was suffering from laryngitis. Hence, the release date of the film was postponed to January 2019.

Response
Nivairoalhi received mostly positive reviews from critics. Aishath Maaha of Dho? favored the performance of the lead actors, particularly praising Ahmed Asim's work. She also mentioned the "neat arrangement" of its screenplay, though she pointed out its "weak ending", saying it was unsatisfactory. Similar sentiments were echoed from Aminath Luba of Sun, who called Asim "outstanding", while other cast members were thought to be "excellent". Luba also found the scene arrangement to be "gripping", while also calling the film's ending "weak".

References

2019 films
Maldivian drama films
Films directed by Moomin Fuad
2019 drama films
Dhivehi-language films